Graeme Davis (born 1958, in Isleworth, England) is a game designer, writer and editor who has worked extensively in the roleplaying game industry.

Biography
Davis started playing Dungeons & Dragons in the mid-1970s, shortly after it was first imported into the United Kingdom.

After leaving school he worked in the banking industry before studying for a Bachelor of Arts degree in archaeology at the University of Durham in 1979. He graduated in 1982, and started work towards a Doctor of Philosophy degree.

Games Workshop's White Dwarf magazine in 1982 gave Davis his first paid opportunity to write an article about Dungeons & Dragons. Other opportunities followed, including White Dwarf and other magazines such as TSR, Inc.'s Imagine.

A job offer from Games Workshop in 1986 prompted Davis to leave university with his Ph.D. unfinished. However, his historical and archaeological knowledge and research skills have been put into use throughout his career with several firms and as a freelancer.

He was one of the original designers of Warhammer Fantasy Roleplay. Games Workshop spun Warhammer Fantasy Roleplay into its new subsidiary Flame Publications in 1989, and Davis remained on staff at Flame.

Davis wrote the Fighting Fantasy Gamebook, Midnight Rogue, in 1987.

Davis published his first novel, Blood and Honor, book four in the Eberron The War-Torn series, in 2006.

Since 2009 Davis has been the line editor for Rogue Games' historical horror RPG Colonial Gothic, contributing to several titles in the line.

Published works (as primary or contributing writer)
Warhammer Fantasy Roleplay 1st edition (1986) and 2nd edition (2005) 
"Rough Night in the Three Feathers", classic WFRP 1e module published in White Dwarf 94 (1987), updated for WFRP 2e in Plundered Vaults (2005)
Midnight Rogue, Fighting Fantasy, Puffin Books, 1987.
GURPS Vikings (Steve Jackson Games; 2nd ed. 2002)  (+ other GURPS titles)
Creatures of Freeport (Green Ronin; 2004)
Ashes of Middenheim (WFRP 2nd edition scenario), 2005.
Blood and Honor (Eberron novel, September 2006)
The Edge of Night (adventure for Warhammer Fantasy Roleplay, 3rd edition; Fantasy Flight Games; 2010)

References

External links 
 Graeme Davis's homepage
 David's RPG credits

 

1958 births
20th-century English novelists
21st-century English novelists
Alumni of Collingwood College, Durham
British video game designers
English fantasy writers
English male novelists
GURPS writers
Live-action role-playing game designers
Living people
People from Isleworth
Role-playing game designers
Role-playing game writers
Warhammer Fantasy Roleplay game designers